Major General Vasyl Vasylovych Durdynets (born 27 September 1937) is a Ukrainian politician and diplomat. He served as Acting Prime Minister of Ukraine during a short period in July 1997.

Biography and career
Vasyl Durdynets was born into peasant family in Czechoslovakia before World War II. In 1960 he graduated the Law faculty of Ivano Franko Lviv State University. In 1958 through 1970 Durdynets was an active member of the Komsomol of Ukraine (1958–1966) and Komsomol (1966–1970) in Lviv, Moscow, and Kyiv. In 1970 he became a staff member of the Lviv regional committee of the Communist Party of Ukraine.

In 1978 Durdynets was appointed as a deputy and in 1982 he became the first deputy Minister of Internal Affairs of Ukraine, holding the post until February 1991. In March 1990 he was elected as a parliamentary to the Verkhovna Rada (first convocation) as member of the Communist Party of the Soviet Union winning the 230th electoral district in Bobrynets, Kirovohrad Oblast. At the first (12th) convocation, Durdynets headed the parliamentary commission on matters of defense and state security and was a non-affiliated member of parliament. Since 29 January 1992 in Verkhovna Rada Durdynets served as vice-speaker (first deputy head).

To the next convocation Durdynets was reelected as non-affiliated at the 229th electoral district in the same city. At the second convocation Durdynets was a leader of deputy group "Center" and the parliamentary commission on fight with organized crime and corruption. Simultaneously he also served as the first deputy chairman of the Presidential coordination committee in fight with corruption and organized crime.

In July 1995 he rose to the position of Vice-Prime Minister in State Security and Extraordinary Situations and the chairman of Presidential Committee in fight of corruption and organized crime. The following year he became first Vice-Prime Minister (18 June 1996) in the Cabinet of the scandalous Pavlo Lazarenko. After serving a brief term as an acting Prime Minister, he was dismissed and appointed the director of the country's National Investigation Bureau (30 July 1997), while continuing to serve as the chairman of Presidential Committee in fight of corruption and organized crime. In 1996 Durdynets became an initiator in creating of the Ministry of Emergencies and matters of population security from consequences of the Chernobyl Disaster. Since 22 March 1999 he served as a Minister of Extraordinary Situations .

Since 1997 Vasyl Durdynets was promoted to the rank of a general of Internal Affairs Service of Ukraine.

In August 1997 he was admitted to the Council of National Security and Defense of Ukraine (RNBO). On 17 February 2000 he became a member of the government committee in the reformation of the agrarian sector and in the affairs of ecology and extraordinary situations.

In 2002 Durdynets unsuccessful ran for parliament in the 73rd electoral district in Zakarpattia Oblast as non-affiliated politician.

His state's awards include 5th and 4th Classes of the Order of Prince Yaroslav the Wise, 3rd Class of the Order of Merit, Order of the Red Banner of Labour, Order of the Badge of Honour, Order for Personal Courage, and Personal Firing Weapon.

On 25 April 2011 the President of Ukraine Viktor Yanukovych awarded Durdynets the "Distinguished Juror of Ukraine" as an advisor of the Ministry of Internal Affairs, a participant in the liquidation of consequences of Chernobyl disaster, and a general of Internal Service of Ukraine.

Durdynets is an honorary professor of the National Academy of Internal Affairs.

See also
Prime Minister of Ukraine

References

External links
 Personal website (empty)

1937 births
Living people
People from Zakarpattia Oblast
People from Carpathian Ruthenia
University of Lviv alumni
Komsomol of Ukraine members
Communist Party of Ukraine (Soviet Union) politicians
Independent politicians in Ukraine
Acting prime ministers of Ukraine
First vice prime ministers of Ukraine
Vice Prime Ministers of Ukraine
Emergency ministers of Ukraine
Deputy chairmen of the Verkhovna Rada
First convocation members of the Verkhovna Rada
Second convocation members of the Verkhovna Rada
Ambassadors of Ukraine to Hungary
Ambassadors of Ukraine to Slovenia
Recipients of the Order of Prince Yaroslav the Wise
Chevaliers of the Order of Merit (Ukraine)
Generals of the Internal Service (Ukraine)